Park Jae-Sang (Hangul: 박재상, Hanja: 朴哉相; born July 20, 1982 in Seongnam, Gyeonggi Province, South Korea) is a South Korean left-handed left fielder who plays for the SK Wyverns in the Korea Baseball Organization.

References 

SSG Landers players
KBO League left fielders
South Korean baseball players
1982 births
Living people
People from Seongnam
Sportspeople from Gyeonggi Province